Gara is a bilingual Spanish newspaper.

Gara may also refer to:

Geography
Gara, Srikakulam, a village in India
Gara, Hungary, a village in Hungary
Gara, Kermanshah, a village in Kermanshah Province, Iran
Gara River (Australia), in New South Wales, Australia
Gara, a village administered by Milişăuţi town, Suceava County, Romania
Gara Banca, a village in Banca Commune, Vaslui County, Romania
Gara Berheci, a village in Gohor Commune, Galați County, Romania
Gara Bobocu, a village in Cochirleanca Commune, Buzău County, Romania
Gara Cilibia, a village in Cilibia Commune, Buzău County, Romania
Gara Docăneasa and Gara Tălăşman, villages in Vinderei Commune, Vaslui County, Romania
Gara Ghidigeni, a village in Ghidigeni Commune, Galați County, Romania
Gara Ianca, a village administered by Ianca town, Brăila County, Romania
Gara Leu, a village in Drăguşeni Commune, Suceava County, Romania
Gara Roşieşti, a village in Roşieşti Commune, Vaslui County, Romania
Călăraşi Gară, a village in Călăraşi Commune, Cluj County, Romania
Dâlga-Gară, a village in Dor Mărunt Commune, Călăraşi County, Romania
Fetești-Gară, a village administered by Fetești town, Ialomița County, Romania
Frăsinet-Gară, a village in Vlădila Commune, Olt County, Romania
Lăculeţe-Gară, a village in Vulcana-Pandele Commune, Dâmboviţa County, Romania
Lehliu Gară, a town in Călăraşi County, Romania
Mărculeşti-Gară, a village in Perişoru Commune, Călăraşi County, Romania
Moţăţei-Gară, a village in Moţăţei Commune, Dolj County, Romania
Sărmășel-Gară, a village administered by Sărmașu town, Mureș County, Romania
Săruleşti-Gară, a village in Săruleşti Commune, Călăraşi County, Romania
Şintereag-Gară, a village in Şintereag Commune, Bistriţa-Năsăud County, Romania
El Gara, a town in Morocco
Ancien Village de Gara, a village in the Central African Republic
Alternative name for the Gaya confederacy

Ethnicity
Garra people (also Gara) of Jammu and Kashmir

People 

 Tony Gara, Zimbabwean politician

Other uses
 General Aviation Revitalization Act (GARA)
 Gara (name)
 Gaara, a fictional character from the manga and anime franchise Naruto
 Gara, a playable character from Warframe

See also
Lough Gara, a lake in Ireland
Garas